Charles Pelham (March 12, 1835 – January 18, 1908) was a U.S. congressional representative from Alabama.

Born in Person County, North Carolina, Pelham moved with his parents to Alabama in 1838. There, he attended the common schools and later studied law. In 1858, he was admitted to the bar and commenced practice in Talladega, Alabama. After the beginning of the U.S. Civil War, Pelham entered the Confederate army in 1862 and served as first lieutenant of Company C, Fifty-first Regiment, Alabama Infantry. After the war, he served as judge of the tenth judicial circuit of Alabama from 1868 until 1873.

Pelham was elected as a Republican to the Forty-third Congress (March 4, 1873 – March 3, 1875). When he was not renominated in 1874, Pelham resumed the practice of law in Washington, D.C. Late in life, he was appointed a clerk in the Treasury Department.

In 1907, he moved to Poulan, Georgia, where he died the following year on January 18, 1908. He was interred in the Presbyterian Cemetery.

See also

 Samuel Taylor Suit, who married Pelham's daughter Rosa

References

External links
 

1835 births
1908 deaths
Confederate States Army officers
Republican Party members of the United States House of Representatives from Alabama
19th-century American politicians